Miloš Kalezić (born 9 August 1993) is a Montenegrin footballer who plays as a midfielder for Sutjeska Nikšić.

Club career
After playing semi-professional football in Montenegro and Slovakia, Kalezić joined FK Sloboda Tuzla where he played in the Premier League of Bosnia and Herzegovina.

Honours
Montenegrin First League:
 Champions (1): 2011–12
Montenegrin Cup:
 Winners (1): 2012–13

References

External links
 

1993 births
Living people
Footballers from Podgorica
Association football midfielders
Montenegrin footballers
Montenegro youth international footballers
Montenegro under-21 international footballers
FK Budućnost Podgorica players
FK Mogren players
OFK Grbalj players
FC ŠTK 1914 Šamorín players
FK Iskra Danilovgrad players
FK Sloboda Tuzla players
OFK Petrovac players
OFK Titograd players
KF Vllaznia Shkodër players
FK Novi Pazar players
Montenegrin First League players
2. Liga (Slovakia) players
Premier League of Bosnia and Herzegovina players
Kategoria Superiore players
Serbian SuperLiga players
Montenegrin expatriate footballers
Expatriate footballers in Slovakia
Expatriate footballers in Bosnia and Herzegovina
Expatriate footballers in Albania
Expatriate footballers in Serbia
Montenegrin expatriate sportspeople in Slovakia
Montenegrin expatriate sportspeople in Bosnia and Herzegovina
Montenegrin expatriate sportspeople in Albania
Montenegrin expatriate sportspeople in Serbia